This is a list of compositions by Germaine Tailleferre (1892–1983). It includes concert works, film and television score and popular works. It does not include arrangements, harmonisations or transcriptions.  In the interests of clarity, some works which are essentially the same works with different titles (the Concerto for Soprano and Orchestra and the Concerto de la Fidelité, for example) have been omitted.

There is a great deal of discussion amongst musicologists as to the authenticity of the various catalogs already published in the handful of biographical works devoted to Germaine Tailleferre, one of which even includes a category of "titles which were not given by the composer". Many works included in those catalogs are missing from this list because they cannot be verified by either published scores or primary manuscript sources.  In order to establish this catalog, we used three types of sources:

1. Works which are easily verifiable through either published scores, recordings,  copies of film and television presentations kept in national archives and works for which concert programmes have been kept at libraries or archives.

2. The records kept at the SACEM (the French performing rights association), using both the old paper catalog and the new computerized catalog.

3. Robert Orledge's catalog of manuscript sources in Germaine Tailleferre (1892–1983) : A Centenary Appraisal" Muziek & Wetenschap 2 (Summer 1992) which he examined in Paris during September, 1991, which include complete scientific descriptions of the manuscript objects.

Chronological list
 1909 Impromptu for piano
 1910 Premières prouesses for piano four hands
 1910 Morceau de lecture for harp
 1912 Fantasie sur thème de G. Cassade, piano quintet
 1913 Berceuse for violin/piano
 1913 Romance for piano
 1913–1917  Le petit livre de harpe de Mme Tardieu
 1917 Jeux de plein air for two pianos
 1917–1926  Jeux de plein air for orchestra
 1917–1919  String Quartet
 1917 Calme et sans lenteur for piano trio
 1918 Image for 8 instruments (flute, clarinet, celesta, piano, string quartet)
 1918 Image for piano 4 hands
 1919 Pastorale for piano, for L'Album des Six
 1920 Morceau symphonique for piano/orchestra
 1920 Ballade for piano and orchestra
 1920 Très vite for piano
 1920 Hommage à Debussy for piano
 1920 Fandango for 2 pianos
 1921 Les mariés de la tour Eiffel : Quadrille/Valse des Dépeches for orchestra
 1921 Première Sonate for violin and piano
 1923 Le marchand d'oiseaux  Ballet for orchestra
 1923 Ballade for piano and orchestra
 1923 Concerto no. 1 for piano and orchestra
 1924 Adagio for violin and Piano
 1925 Berceuse du petit elephant for Solo Voice/Chorus/F Horns
 1925 Mon cousin de Cayenne, incidental music for Ensemble
 1925 Ban'da for Chorus and Orchestra
 1927 Concertino  for Harp and Orchestra
 1927 Sous le rempart d'Athènes, incidental music for Orchestra
 1928 Deux valses for Two Pianos
 1928 Pastorale en lab  for Piano
 1928 Sicilienne for Piano
 1928 Nocturno-Fox for two Baritone Voices and Ensemble
 1929 La nouvelle Cythère for Two Pianos or Orchestra
 1929 Six chansons françaises for Voice and Piano
 1929 Pastorale en Ut for Piano
 1929 Pastorale Inca for Piano
 1929 Vocalise-étude   for High Voice and Piano
 1930 Fleurs de France for Piano or String Orchestra
 1931 Zoulaïna opéra comique (French text by Georges Hirsch)
 1932 Ouverture for Orchestra
 1934 Largo for Violin and Piano
 1934 La chasse à l'enfant for Voice and Piano  (French text by Jacques Prévert)
 1934  Le chanson de l'elephant  for Voice and Piano
 1934 Deux poèmes de Lord Byron for High Voice and Piano (English text by Lord Byron)
 1934 Concerto for Two Pianos, Chorus, Saxophones and Orchestra
 1935 Divertissement dans le style Louis Quinze, incidental music for orchestra, including baroque instruments
 1935  Les souliers,  film music
 1935 Chanson de Firmin Voice and Piano, French text by Henri Jeanson
 1936  Cadenzas for Mozart’s Concerto no 22 in Eb for Piano
 1936 Cadenzas for Haydn’s Concerto no 15 for Piano
 1937 Concerto for Violin and Orchestra
 1937 Au pavilion D'Alsace for Piano
 1937 Provincia, film score
 1937 Symphonie grapique, film score
 1937 Sur les routes d'acier, film score
 1937 Terre d'effort de de liberté, film score
 1937 Ces dames aux chapeaux verts, film score
 1938 Cantate de Narcisse for baritone martin, soprano, SSAA chorus, strings and tympani
 1938 Le petit chose, film score
 1939 Prelude et Fugue for Organ, with Trumpet and Trombone, ad lib.
 1940 Bretagne''', film score
 1941 Les deux timides, film score
 1942 Trois études for Piano and Orchestra
 1942 Pastorale for Flute (or Violin) and Piano
 1943 Deux danses du marin de Bolivar for Piano
 1946 Les confidences d'un microphone for Piano, Radio Music
 1946 Intermezzo pour deux pianos
 1946 Intermezzo for Flute and Piano
 1946 Coïncidences, film score
 1948 Paris-Magie, ballet for orchestra or two pianos
 1949 Quadrille, ballet for orchestra
 1949 Payssages de France, suite for orchestra
 1949 Paris sentimentale for voice and Piano (French text by Marthe Lacloche)
 1950 Les marchés du sud, film music
 1951 2ème Sonate for Violin and Piano
 1951 Parfums, musical comedy
 1951 Il etait un petit navire, opéra comique (French libretto by Henri Jeanson)
 1951 Suite "Il etait un petit navire" for two pianos
 1951–54   La bohème eternale,  theatre music
 1951(?) Chant chinois, for Piano
 1951 Concerto No. 2 for Piano and Orchestra
 1952 Sarabande de La guirlande de Campra, for orchestra
 1952 Seule dans la forêt, for piano
 1952 Dans la clairière, for piano
 1952 Concertino for Flute, Piano and String Orchestra
 1952 Sicilienne for Flute and Two Pianos
 1952 Le roi de la creation, film music
 1952 Valse pour le funambule for Piano
 1952 Caroline au pays natal, film score
 1952 Caroline au palais, film score
 1952 Conférence des animaux, radio music
 1953 Caroline fait du cinéma, film score
 1953 Cher vieux Paris, film score
 1953 Caroline du sud, film score
 1953 Gavarni et son temps, television score
 1953 Parisiana, ballet for orchestra
 1953?  Entre deux guerres, film score
 1954  L'aigle des rues, suite for Piano
 1954 Fugue for Orchestra
 1954 Charlie valse for Piano
 1954 Deux pieces, for Piano
 1955 Une rouille à l'arsenic, for voice and piano (French texts by Denise Centore)
 1955 La rue chagrin for voice and piano
 1955 Du style galant au style méchant, 4 Opéras de poche
 Le bel ambitieux, chamber opera
 La fille d'opéra, chamber OperaMonsieur Petitpois achete un château, chamber opera
 La pauvre Eugénie, chamber opera
 1955 Ici la voix, radio music for orchestra
 1955 C'est facile à dire for voice and piano (French Text)
 1955 Dejeuner sur L'herbe for voice and piano (French Text by Claude Marcy)
 1955 L'enfant for voice and piano (French Text by Claude Marcy)
 1955 Il avait une barbe noir for voice and piano (French Text by Claude Marcy)
 1956 Concerto des Vaines Paroles for Baritone, Piano and Orchestra (French text by Jean Tardieu)
 1956 L'homme notre ami, film music
 1956 Le travail fait le patron, film
 1957 Les plus beau jours, film music
 1957 Histoires secrète, radio score
 1957 Petite suite, for Orchestra
 1957 La petite sirène, opera (French text by Philippe Soupault)
 1957 Sonate for Solo Clarinet
 1957 Adalbert, radio score
 1957 Sonata for Harp
 1957 Toccata pour deux pianos
 1957 Partita for Piano
 1957 Tante chinoise et les autres, film score for string and wind players
 1959 Mémoires d'une bergère, Radio Score
 1959 Le maître, chamber opera (French text by Eugène Ionesco)
 1959 Pancarte pour une porte d'entrée, voice and piano (French texts by Robert Pinget)
 1960 Temps de pose, radio score
 1960 Les requins sur nos cotes, film music
 1960 La rentrée des foins, television score
 1961 Les grandes personnes (English title – Time out for Love/The Adults), film music
 1962 Au paradis avec les anes, radio score (French text by Francis Jammes)
 1962 Partita, for Oboe, clarinet, Bassoon and Strings
 1963 L'adieu du cavalier, in memoriam Francis Poulenc for voice and piano (French text by Guillaume Apollinaire)
 1964 Sans merveille, television score
 1964?   Concerto for Two Guitars and Orchestra
 1964 Hommage à Rameau for Two pianos and four percussion
 1964 Évariste Galois ou l'Éloge des mathématiques, television score
 1964 Sonata alla Scarlatti for Harp
 1966 Anatole, television score
 1969 Entonnement,  for ob-hrp pf str
 1969 Jacasseries, for fl, ob, cl cel, hp, str
 1969 Amertume, for fl, ob, cl, hn, hp, str
 1969 Angoise, for chamber orchestra
 1970 Impressionnisme for Flute, Two Pianos and Double bass, film score
 1972 Forlane for flute and piano
 1972 Barbizon for piano
 1972 Sonate champêtre for Oboe, Clarinet, Bassoon and Piano
 1973 Rondo, for Oboe and Piano
 1973 Arabesque, for Clarinet/Piano
 1973 Choral, for Trumpet and Piano
 1973 Sonatine, for Violin and Piano
 1973 Gaillarde, for Trumpet and Piano
 1974 Sonate, for Two Pianos
 1974–75 Sonate, for piano four hands
 1974–75 Symphonietta for Trumpet, Tympani and Strings
 1975–1981 Enfantines for Piano
 1975 Singeries for Piano
 1975 Escarpolète for Piano
 1975 Menuet for Oboe (Clarinet or Saxophone) and Piano
 1975 Allegretto for Three Clarinets (three trumpets or Three Saxophones) and Piano
 1975 Piement des Pyrenées françaises, film music
 1975–78  Trois Sonatines, for Piano
 1976 Marche for Concert Band (orch. Dondeyne)
 1976 Choral et Fugue for Concert Band (orch. Wehage)
 1976–77   Sérénade en La mineur, for four winds and piano or harpsichord
 1977 Nocturne for organ
 1977 Aube  for soprano solo/SATB chorus
 1977 Trois chansons de Jean Tardieu for voice and piano (French text by Jean Tardieu)
 1977 Un bateau en chocolat, for voice and piano (French text by Jean Tardieu)
 1977 Suite divertimento, for piano or concert Band
 1978 Trio for Violin, Violoncello and Piano
 1979 Choral et variations for two pianos or orchestra
 1979 Choral et deux variations'',  for woodwind or brass quintet
 1979 Menuet en Fa for oboe, clarinet, bassoon and piano
 1979 Sarabande, for two instruments or piano
 1980 Suite burlesque, for piano 4 hands
 1981 Concerto de la fidelité, for high voice and orchestra
 1982 20 lécons de solfege, voice and piano
 ???? Guitare for Solo Guitar

References

 
Tailleferre